Infamy is the fifth studio album by the American hip hop duo Mobb Deep. Infamy was released after Jay-Z dissed Prodigy and Nas on his song "Takeover," from Jay-Z's 2001 album, The Blueprint, which caused Prodigy to strike back on the Track "Crawlin". Infamy has been certified Gold by the RIAA, selling over 800,000 copies in the United States of America. It has been successful critically as well as commercially, getting good scores from The Source and HipHopDX, as well as Allmusic and Rolling Stone magazine.

Track listing
Credits adapted from the album's liner notes.

Samples
Get Away
"Taking Me Higher" by Barclay James Harvest

Nothing Like Home
"Cause I Love You" by Lenny Williams

Get At Me
"Project Titan 2" by Nick Ingman
"Spread Love" by Mobb Deep

Charts

Weekly charts

Year-end charts

Certifications

References

2001 albums
Mobb Deep albums
Loud Records albums
Albums produced by the Alchemist (musician)
Albums produced by Havoc (musician)
Albums produced by Scott Storch